Buford Township, population 10,323, is one of nine townships in Union County, North Carolina. The Town of Mineral Springs, North Carolina barely covers the northwest of corner of the township.

Geography
The northside of the township is drained by tributaries to Richardson Creek including Adams Branch, Beaverdam Creek, Little Richardson Creek, and Rays Fork.  The east side of the township is drained by Lanes Creek and its tributaries, Wicker Branch and Mill Creek.  The southside of the township is drained by the Lynches River and its tributaries Buffalo Creek and Polecat Creek.  The southwest side is drained by Cane Creek.  The west side is drained by Glen Branch of Waxhaw Creek.

References

Townships in Union County, North Carolina
Townships in North Carolina